Subbanna Ayyappan  (born 10 December 1955) is an Indian aquaculture scientist hailing from the Karnataka State who has held several key positions in various Govt organisations related to agricultural science. He was the Director-General of Indian Council of Agricultural Research (ICAR) and Secretary to Government, Department of Agricultural Research and Education (DARE) during Jan 2010 – Feb 2016. He was also the Chancellor of Central Agricultural University, Manipur. He was instrumental in bringing about the Blue Revolution in India. He was the first non-crop scientist to head the ICAR.

Ayyappan holds a Ph.D., degree from Bangalore University and a master's degree in Fish Production and Management from the College of Fisheries in Mangalore. He has published several research papers in areas of fisheries, limnology, and aquatic microbiology.

Ayyappan began his career in ICAR as a scientist at Central Inland Fisheries Research Institute, Barrackpore in 1978. In 1996 he was appointed as the Director, CIFA, Bhubaneswar, where he served for almost five years prior to holding the office of the Director, CIFE, Mumbai (Deemed University). He came to the ICAR headquarter in 2002 as the Deputy Director General (Fisheries) and served for almost eight years in that capacity before taking up the important post of the Secretary, DARE and Director General, ICAR on 1 January 2010. He was the founder Chief Executive of the National Fisheries Development Board, DAHD&I, Hyderabad (2006-2008).

Recognition: Padma Shri

In the year 2022, Govt of India conferred the Padma Shri award, the third highest award in the Padma series of awards, on Subbanna Ayyappan for their distinguished service in the field of science and engineering. The award is in recognition of his service as a "Respected Aquaculture Scientist - playing a key role in powering India's Blue Revolution".

Other recognitions and awards

Subbanna Ayyappan has received several recognitions and awards for his work related to aquaculture and related areas. These include:

Zahoor Qasim Gold Medal awarded by the Society of Biosciences in India (1996-1997)
Special ICAR Award (1997)
ICAR Award for Team Research as the Team leader for significant contributions in fisheries (1997-1998)
Dr. V.G. Jhingran Gold medal (2002)
Prof. H.P.C. Shetty Award for Excellence in Fisheries Research and Development, Asian Fisheries Society, Indian Branch (2002)

References

Bangalore University alumni
Recipients of the Padma Shri in science & engineering
1955 births
Living people